Matabeng Store Airstrip  is an airstrip serving the village of Matabeng in Qacha's Nek District, Lesotho.

See also

Transport in Lesotho
List of airports in Lesotho

References

External links
 Matabeng
 HERE Maps - Matabeng
 OpenStreetMap - Matabeng
 OurAirports - Matabeng

Airports in Lesotho